Bengal Lancers may refer to numerous regiments of the British Indian Army, many continuing in the Indian Army.

Individual units

 1st Bengal Lancers
 2nd Bengal Lancers
 4th Bengal Lancers
 6th Bengal Lancers
 7th Lancers
 8th Lancers
 10th Bengal Lancers
 11th Bengal Lancers
 13th Bengal Lancers
 14th Bengal Lancers
 17th Bengal Lancers
 19th Bengal Lancers
 41st Bengal Lancers

See also

 The Lives of a Bengal Lancer (book)
 The Lives of a Bengal Lancer (film)
 Tales of the 77th Bengal Lancers (television series)
 Bengal Lancers in the St. Louis Veiled Prophet Parade and Ball

British Indian Army regiments
Armoured and cavalry regiments of the Indian Army from 1947